The Al Farouq training camp, also called Jihad Wel al-Farouq, was a Taliban and Al-Qaeda training camp near Kandahar, Afghanistan. Camp attendees received small-arms training, map-reading, orientation, explosives training, and other training. Nasir al-Bahri reported that the camp was only established following the arrival of Egyptian Islamic Jihad and Egyptian Islamic Group militants who had suitable expertise as to provide training to others.

The United States attacked the area with cruise missiles on August 20, 1998, in retaliation for the 1998 embassy bombings. It continued to operate until August 2001, when it was shut down by its trainers.<ref name="lack">Temple-Raston, Dina. The Jihad Next Door: The Lackawanna Six and Rough Justice in the Age of Terror, 2007</ref> The camp was bombed again on October 10, 2001.

According to U.S. intelligence analysts, the director of the Al Farouq camp was a Saudi named Abdul Quduz, who was later one of the commanders at the battle of Tora Bora.

Abu Walid al Masri (b. 1945), one of the Afghan Arabs who fought as volunteers in the 1980s against the Soviet Union, had stayed in Afghanistan after the Soviet withdrawal. During the mid-1990s, at the age of about 50, he served as a senior trainer at the camp. In this period, various ethnic factions in Afghanistan were competing for power, with the Taliban soon to emerge in control. Saif al-Adel stated that Asim al-Yamani was also a trainer at the camp.

Individuals alleged to have attended the Al Farouq training camp

|-
| Mohammed Ahmed Binyam ||
The allegations prepared for his Combatant Status Review Tribunal alleged:
{| class="wikitable" border="1"
|
"The detainee arrived in Islamabad, Pakistan, in June 2001, and traveled to the al Faruq training camp in Afghanistan, to receive paramilitary training."
"At the al Faruq camp, the detainee received 40 days of training in light arms handling, explosives, and principles of topography."
"The detainee was taught to falsify documents, and received instruction from a senior al Qaida operative on how to encode telephone numbers before passing them to another individual."
|}
|-
| Mohammad Ahmed Abdullah Saleh Al Hanashi ||
Two of the factors prepared for Al Hanashi's Administrative Review Board hearing justifying his continued detention were:
{| class="wikitable" border="1"
|
"Ghailani identified the detainee as being present at the al-Faruq Training Camp in Afghanistan where he underwent basic training in 1998 to 1999 before moving on to the front lines in Kabul, Afghanistan."
"Ghailani is a Tanzanian al-Qaida operative who has been indicted in the 1998 U.S. embassy bombings in Kenya and Tanzania." 
|}
|-
| Al Silm Haji Hajjaj Awwad Al Hajjaji ||
One of the allegations Al Hajjaji faced during his Combatant Status Review Tribunal was: 
{| class="wikitable" border="1"
|
"The Detainee received military training at the Al Qaeda camp located at Al Farouk."
|}
|-
| Abu Bakr Ibn Ali Muhhammad Alahdal ||
One of the allegations Al Hajjaji faced during his Combatant Status Review Tribunal was: 
{| class="wikitable" border="1"
|
"The detainee received small arms training at the al Farouq training camp."
|}
|-
| Tarek Ali Abdullah Ahmed Baada ||
One of the allegations Al Hajjaji faced during his Combatant Status Review Tribunal was: 
{| class="wikitable" border="1"
|
"The detainee attended the al Farouq training camp."
|}
|-
| Muhhammad Said Bin Salem ||
"The detainee received training in the use of the Kalishnikov rifle, the RPG, and the PK machine gun at the al Farouq training camp near Kandahar, Afghanistan."
|-
| Muieen A Deen Jamal A Deen Abd Al Fusal Abd Al Sattar||
Three of the allegations prepared for Al Sattar's Combatant Status Review Tribunal were:
{| class="wikitable" border="1"
|
"The detainee was a trainer at the al Farouq training camp."
"The detainee was trying to become a 'Kuwadir', a more specialized trainer."
"Usama Bin Laden chooses his bodyguards from the 'Kuwadirs'."
|}
|-
| Ayoub Murshid Ali Saleh ||
Two of the allegations prepared for Saleh's Combatant Status Review Tribunal were:
{| class="wikitable" border="1"
|
"The detainee trained at al Farouq training camp."
"While at al Farouq, the detainee trained on the Kalashnikov, BEKA, ROG , Molotov cocktails, defensive and offensive grenades, topography, crawling, signals, and how to ignite 50 grams of TNT ."
|}
|-
| Mahmud Salem Horan Mohammed Mutlak Al Ali ||
One of the allegations prepared for Al Ali's Combatant Status Review Tribunal was:
{| class="wikitable" border="1"
|
"Detainee traveled to Afghanistan with the intent to attend training at the al Farouq training camp, but the al Farouq training camp, because of changes necessitated after the events on 11 September 2001."
|}
|-
| Faizal Saha Al Nasir ||
Al Nasir told his Tribunal: 
{| class="wikitable" border="1"
|
"I did not know that the Al-Farouq camp was a part of Al Qaida or associated with Al Qaida. I did not know they were against the United States, That is all I have."
|}
|-
| Amran Baqur Mohammed Hawsawi||
Two of the allegations prepared for Hawsawi's Combataant Status Review Tribunal were:
{| class="wikitable" border="1"
|
"The detainee was identified to be in Kabul, Afghanistan, training at the al-Farouq camp."
"The detainee was in the camp when the United States bombardment began and he sustained shrapnel injuries."
|}
|-
| Hani Saiid Mohammad Al Khalif ||
Two of the allegations prepared for Al Khalif's Combataant Status Review Tribunal were:
{| class="wikitable" border="1"
|
"The detainee was trained to use the Kalishnikov rifle, the PK machine gun, the 9mm pistol, and rocket-propelled grenades while at the Farouq camp. He also had physical training, learned to read maps, dig trenches, and use camouflage techniques."
"The detainee trained at al Farouq in the detection, avoidance, disarming, and displacement of various antitank and antipersonnel mines."
|}
|-
| Muhammad Ahmad Abdallah Al Ansi ||
One of the allegations prepared for Al Ansi's Combatant Status Review Tribunal was: 
{| class="wikitable" border="1"
|
"A senior al Qaida Commander said he recognized the detainee as someone he had seen in either Kabul or one of the camps in Afghanistan, possibly the Farouq camp between 1998 and 2000."
|}
|-
| Majid Al Barayan ||
Two of the allegations prepared for Al Barayan's Combataant Status Review Tribunal were:
{| class="wikitable" border="1"
|
"The detainee trained at the al Farouq training camp in Afghanistan."
"The detainee received weapons and explosives training."
|}
|-
| Zahar Omar Hamis Bin Hamdoun ||
Three of the allegations prepared for Hamdoun's Combatant Status Review Tribunal were:
{| class="wikitable" border="1"
|
"The detainee trained at the al Farouq camp."
"The detainee completed training on the AK-47 rifle, M-16 rifle, rocket-propelled grenade launcher, PK machine gun, and hand grenades."
"The detainee attended a lecture by Usama Bin Laden."
|}
|-
| Ravil Mingazov ||
Three of the allegations prepared for Hamdoun's Combatant Status Review Tribunal were:
{| class="wikitable" border="1"
|
"The detainee was at the al Farouq camp and was trained on explosives, chemicals, pistols and rifles plus assassination methods.  He also trained on how to make poisons at the Kara Karga camp outside of Kabul."
"The detainee observed Usama Bin Laden while at the training camp and listened to his speeches on politics and religion."
"The detainee was at the al Farouq camp on 11 September 2001."
|}
|-
| Khalid Mohammed Salih Al Dhuby ||
Two of the allegations prepared for Al Dhuby's Combatant Status Review Tribunal were:
{| class="wikitable" border="1"
|
"The detainee went to the al Farouq camp and completed basic training."
"The detainee received training on the use of the Kalashnikov rifle, PK machine gun, and rocket propelled grenade (RPG)."
|}
|-
| Turki Mash Awi Zayid Al Asiri ||
Two of the allegations prepared for Al Asiri's Combatant Status Review Tribunal were:
{| class="wikitable" border="1"
|
"The detainee trained at the al Farouq camp for about one month."
"The detainee received physical exercise and weapons training while at the al Farouq camp."
|}
|-
| Abbas Habid Rumi Al Naely ||  	
One of the allegations prepared for Al Naely's Combatant Status Review Tribunal was: 
{| class="wikitable" border="1"
|
"The detainee stayed at the Al Farouq camp in Darwanta, Afghanistan, where he received 1,000 Rupees to continue his travels."
|}
|-
| Sameur Abdenour ||
One of the allegations Abdenour faced during his Tribunal was: 
{| class="wikitable" border="1"
|
"The detainee volunteered to go see the Al Farouq camp.  While visiting Al Farouq, attempts were made to recruit the detainee and other visitors."
|}
|-
| Mahmoud Omar Mohammed Bin Atef ||
Two of the allegations prepared for Bin Atef's Combatant Status Review Tribunal were:
{| class="wikitable" border="1"
|
"The detainee completed military training at Al Farouq."
"The detainee received weapons training on the Kalashnikov rifle, rocket-propelled grenade launcher, and pistols."
|}
|-
| Fahmi Salem Said Al Sani ||
One of the allegations Al Sani faced during his Tribunal was: 
{| class="wikitable" border="1"
|
"The detainee received training on the Kalashnikov rifle at al Farouq."
|}
|-
| Mahrar Rafat Al Quwari ||
One of the allegations prepared for Al Quwari's Tribunal was: 
{| class="wikitable" border="1"
|
"While at the al Farouq training camp in Afghanistan, the detainee was in charge of delivering food to caves."
|}
|-
| Saed Khatem Al Malki ||
One of the allegations Al Malki would have faced during his Tribunal was: 
{| class="wikitable" border="1"
|
"The detainee was identified as having trained in mountain tactics at the al Qaida training facility in Al Farouq."
|}
|-
| Mohammed Ahmed Said Haidel ||
Two of the allegations Haidel faced during his Tribunal were:
{| class="wikitable" border="1"
|
"The detainee trained at al Farouq."
"The detainee received weapons training for the Kalishnikov rifle, the PK machine gun, and rocket-propelled grenade launcher."
|}
|-
| Khalid Hassan Husayn Al Barakat ||
One of the allegations Al Barakat faced during his Tribunal was: 
{| class="wikitable" border="1"
|
"The Detainee trained at al Farouq and Kandahar, Afghanistan."
|}
|-
| Said Muhammed Salih Hatim ||
Two of the allegations Hatim faced during his Tribunal were: 
{| class="wikitable" border="1"
|
"The detainee received weapons training at al Farouq."
"While detainee was training at al Farouq, Usama Bin Laden visited and lectured to the camp."
|}
|-
| Ahmed Yaslam Said Kuman ||
The detainee attended training at al Farouq, participating in Advanced Commando training in Kandahar, Afghanistan.  Training consisted of rappelling, sniper training, kidnapping, assassinations, poisons and explosives.
|-
| Umran Bakr Muhammad Hawsawi||
One of the factors prepared for Hawsawi's Administrative Review Board, justifying his continued detention, was: 
{| class="wikitable" border="1"
|
"The detainee was identified to be in Kabul, Afghanistan training at the al Farouq camp."
|}
|-
| Abdul Rahman Umir Al Qyati ||
Four of the factors prepared for Al Qyati's Administrative Review Board, justifying his continued detention, were:
{| class="wikitable" border="1"
|
"The detainee was trained on the Kalashnikov and Simonov rifles while at al Farouq training camp.
"The detainee arrived at al Farouq training camp in the beginning of May 2001."
"After training at the al Farouq camp, the detainee traveled extensively with his unit from Qandahar throughout eastern Afghanistan."
"The detainee may be able to provide specific information on the type of training and personalities involved with the administration of training at the al Farouq camp."
|}
|-
| Saleh Mohamed Al Zuba ||
One of the factors, prepared for his Administrative Review Board, justifying his continued detention, was: 
{| class="wikitable" border="1"
|
"Al Zuba admits being at Al Farouq training camp."
|}
|-
| Nayif Abdallah Ibrahim Al Nukhaylan||
Two of the factors prepared for al Nukhaylan's Administrative Review Board, justifying his continued detention, were:
{| class="wikitable" border="1"
|
"Detainee admits receiving training at al-Farouq weapons training camp.  He received instruction on the AK-47 rifle, PK machine gun, and RPG weapons system."
"Detainee admits knowing that al-Farouq training camp belonged to Usama Bin Laden and that it was a terrorist training camp."
|}
|-
| Mustafa Abdul Qawi Abdul Aziz Al Shamyri||
One of the factors prepared for Al Shamyri's Administrative Review Board, justifying his continued detention, was: 
{| class="wikitable" border="1"
|
"The detainee fully admits he was supposed to attend training at al Farouk Camp, but training was not mandated because al Hadrani vouched for detainee's previous training."
|}
|-
| Umran Bakr Muhammad Hawsawi ||
One of the factors prepared for Hawsawi's Administrative Review Board, justifying his continued detention, was: 
{| class="wikitable" border="1"
|
"The detainee was identified to be in Kabul, Afghanistan training at the al Farouq camp."
|}
|-
| Abdullah Yahia Yousf Al Shabli ||
Two of the factors prepared for Al Shabli's Administrative Review Board, justifying his continued detention, was:
{| class="wikitable" border="1"
|
"In August 2001, the detainee flew from San'a Yemen to Iran. He traveled through Iran to Herat, Afghanistan and then on to Qandahar.  The detainee was recruited to go to al Farouq training camp by a Mujahedin fighter who had fought in Afghanistan."
"In August 2001, the detainee traveled to Afghanistan for Jihad. While in Afghanistan he attended al Farouk training camp where he trained on the Kalashnikov rifle, Simonov rifle, and Rocket-Propelled Grenade."
|}
|-
| Abdul Rahman Nashi Badi Al Hataybi ||
Two of the factors prepared for Al Hataybi's Administrative Review Board, justifying his continued detention, was:
{| class="wikitable" border="1"
|
"The detainee trained at al Qaida’s al Farouq paramilitary camp."
"The detainee received training in the AK-47, Makarov pistol and M-16."
|}
|-
| Tariq Shallah Hasan Al Alawi Al Harbi ||
Three of the factors prepared for Al Harbi's Administrative Review Board, justifying his continued detention, were:
{| class="wikitable" border="1"
|
"After arriving in Afghanistan, the detainee trained at the al Farouq training camp."
"At the al Farouq training camp, he received training on the Kalashnikov rifle and pistols."
"In Quetta, Pakistan, detainee met some Taliban on the street who led the detainee to a guesthouse in Qandahar, where he stayed for a week of questioning and was then sent to the "Faruk camp" for training."
|}
|-
| Humud Dakhil Humud Sa'id Al Jad'an ||
Two of the allegations prepare for Al Jad'an's Tribunal were:
{| class="wikitable" border="1"
|
"Detainee trained with weapons and explosives at the al Farouq training camp and also at the Camp Melek (Camp Saber) training camp." 
"Detainee saw Usama Bin Laden at al Faronq on two separate occasions during his basic training."
|}
|-
| Nabil Hadjarab ||
One of the allegations Hadjarab's Tribunal was:
{| class="wikitable" border="1"
|
"The detainee attended the Al Farouq training camp.
|}
|-
| Mohammad Bawazir ||
Three of allegations Bawazir faced during his Tribunal were:
{| class="wikitable" border="1"
|
"The detainee trained at al Farouq training camp."
"The detainee received training on the Kalashnikov, Pakistan machine gun , explosives, and the rocket propelled grenade (RPG)  at the al Farouq camp.
"Usama Bin Ladin  spoke at the al Farouq camp while the detainee was in training."
|}
|-
| Muhammad Abd Al Nasir Muhammad Khantumani ||
One of the allegations against Khantumani was: 
{| class="wikitable" border="1"
|
"The Detainee trained at al Farouq training camp;"
|}
Two other allegations against Khantumani concerned his training at al Farouq, but his Tribunal's Recorder failed to include them in his transcript.
|-
| Salman Yahya Hassan Mohammed RabeiiFactors for and against the continued detention (.pdf)  of Salman Yahya Hassan Mohammed Rabeii Administrative Review Board - 28 January 2005 - page 65 ||
Two of the allegations against Rabeii prepared for his Tribunal were:
{| class="wikitable" border="1"
|
"Detainee attended the Al Farouq training camp in August 2001."
"Detainee was captured with other members of his training squad from the Al Farouq training camp."
|}
|-
| Ahmed Bin Kadr LabedSummarized transcript (.pdf) , from Ahmed Bin Kadr Labed's Administrative Review Board hearing - page 107 ||
During his Tribunal Labed faced the allegation: 
{| class="wikitable" border="1"
|
"The detainee received training on the AK-47, RPGs,  grenades and pistols at al Farouq; all of the aforementioned training occurred sometime in September 2001."
|}
One of the factors prepared for Labed's Administrative Review Board, justifying his continued detention, was: 
{| class="wikitable" border="1"
|
"In September 2001, the detainee attended the al Farouq Training Camp and the surrounding mountain training area for approximately thirteen days.  While in the mountains, he received training on the Kalashnikov rile,  Rocket Propelled Grenade and physical training."
|}
|-
| Mohammed Nasir Yahya KhusrufSummarized transcript (.pdf) , from Mohammed Nasir Yahya Khusruf's Administrative Review Board hearing - pages 1-12 ||
Two of the allegations Khusruf faced during his Tribunal were:
{| class="wikitable" border="1"
|
"The Detainee attended the al Farouq training camp."
"The Detainee was trained on the Kalashnikov, Siminoff, and single-shot rifle at the al Farouq Training camp."
|}
Two of the factor prepared for Khusruf's Administrative Review Board, justifying his continued detention, were:
{| class="wikitable" border="1"
|
"The detainee did not perform any formal military service.  He received small arms training at al Farouq camp in Afghanistan."
"The detainee trained at al Farouq for 18 to 20 days.  He shot the Simonov rifle and Kalashnikov rifle twelve times.  He received map and land navigation training."
|}
|-
| Ghanim Abdul Rahman Al Harbi ||
During his Combatant Status Review Tribunal Al Harbi faced the allegation that he attended Al Farouq.
|-
| Tariq Mahmoud Ahmed Al Sawah ||
One of the allegations Al Sawah faced during his Tribunal was: 
{| class="wikitable" border="1"
|
"Detainee admits that he attended explosives training at Al Farouq training camp and went on to be a trainer on IED components at Tarnak Farms."
|}
|-
| Mohammed Ahmed Salam ||
One of the allegations prepared for Salam's Tribunal was: 
{| class="wikitable" border="1"
|
"The detainee was at al Farouq during the summer of 2001."
|}
|-
| Ha Il Aziz Ahmed Al Maythali ||
Five of the allegations prepared for Al Maythali's Tribunal were: 
{| class="wikitable" border="1"
|
"The detainee trained at the al Farouq training camp.
"While at the al Farouq camp; the detainee was trained on the Kalashnikov rifle, PK machine gun, Makarov pistol, and Rocket Propelled Grenades (RPG's) .
"The detainee was also trained in trench digging, disguise, mountain climbing, map reading and orienteering at al Farouq.
"The detainee returned to the al Farouq camp for advanced training, which consisted of preparation for fighting and reconnaissance techniques."
"The detainee was at al Farouq on three separate occasions when Usama Bin Laden gave lectures."
|}
|-
| Muhsin Muhammad Musheen Moqbill ||
Two of the factors prepared for Moqbil's Administrative Review Board, justifying his continued detention, were:
{| class="wikitable" border="1"
|
"The detainee attended the al Farouq camp for weapons training with the Kalashnikov rifle, PK machine gun, and the rocket propelled grenade (RPG)."
"The detainee was personally trained by the head of the al Farouq camp."
|}
|-
| Saleh Ali Jaid Al Khathami ||
One allegation Al Khathami faced during his Tribunal was: 
{| class="wikitable" border="1"
|
"The detainee received small arms training at the Al-Farouq training camp."
|}
|-
| Fahd Salih Sulayman Al Jutayli ||
Two of the allegations Al Jutayli faced during his Tribunal were:
{| class="wikitable" border="1"
|
"Detainee trained at Al Farouq training camp''' in Afghanistan during September 2001."
"Detainee was trained on the Kalashnikov rifle, Pakistan machine gun, and a Russian pistol at the Al Farouq training camp."
|}
|-
| Fahed Nasser Mohamed ||
Three of the allegations Mohamed faced during his Tribunal were:
{| class="wikitable" border="1"
|
"The detainee received small arms training at the al Farouq training camp in Afghanistan."
"The detainee attended training at al Qaida's al Farouq camp in Afghanistan."
"Usama Bin Laden visited the al Farouq training camp while the detainee was in training."
|}
|-
| Assem Matruq Mohammad Al Aasmi||
Two of the factors prepared for Al Aasmi's Administrative Review Board, justifying his continued detention, were:
{| class="wikitable" border="1"
|
"When the detainee arrived in AF, he attended the al Farouq training camp."
"At the al Farouq training camp, the detainee learned how to use the Kalishnikov rifle, a rocket propelled grenade (RPG), a handgun and a "Biki" rifle."
|}
|-
| Abdel Ghalib Ahmad Hakim ||
During his Tribunal Hakim faced the allegation that he attended al Farouq.
|-
| Murtada Ali Said Maqram ||
One of the allegations Maqram faced, during his Tribunal, was: 
{| class="wikitable" border="1"
|
"The detainee received weapons training on the Kalashnikov , the PK machine gun, and the Makarov pistol at the al Farouq training camp, for one month from October - November 2001."
|}
|-
| Emad Abdalla Hassan ||
One of the allegations Hassan faced during his Tribunal was: 
{| class="wikitable" border="1"
|
"While in Afghanistan, the detainee received training at the Al-Farouq training camp."
|}
|-
| Ibrahim Mahdy Achmed Zeidan ||
One of the allegations Zeidan faced, during his Tribunal, was:
{| class="wikitable" border="1"
|
"The detainee attended al Qaida's al Faruq camp''' in Afghanistan in 2000."
|}
|-
| Ibrahim Bin Shakran ||
The Summary of Evidence memo  prepared for Mana Shaman Allabardi Al Tabi's
first annual Administrative Review Board, 
on 18 July 2005 stated:
{| class="wikitable" border="1"
|
Ibrahim Bin Shakran trained at the al Farouk training camp and fought on the Taliban front lines.
|}
|}

References

Al-Qaeda facilities
Terrorist training camps